Gabriel Luke (born November 26, 1969) is an American former sprinter.  He was the 1991 NCAA Champion in the 400 meters running for Rice University.  Later that year he anchored the United States 4x400 metres relay team to win at the World University Games.

References

1969 births
Living people
American male sprinters
Athletes (track and field) at the 1991 Pan American Games
Pan American Games medalists in athletics (track and field)
Pan American Games silver medalists for the United States
Universiade medalists in athletics (track and field)
Universiade gold medalists for the United States
Medalists at the 1991 Summer Universiade
Medalists at the 1991 Pan American Games